Dike Chukwumerije is a Nigerian spoken word and performance poetry artist and author. He has eight published books including the novel Urichindere, which won the 2013 Association of Nigerian Authors (ANA) Prize for Prose Fiction and a poetry theatre production – Made in Nigeria – currently touring the country. In October of 2018, he had been to nine Nigerian cities: Abuja, Lagos, Enugu, Benin, Ile-Ife, Maiduguri, Yola, Bonny, and Jos.

Chukwumerije was cited as one of the Top 100 most influential Africans by New African magazine in 2016.

Early life

Dike was born in Lagos, and completed his primary and secondary education in the same city before moving north to Abuja. He studied for an LLB Law at the University of Abuja and later obtained a master's degree in Law and Development from SOAS, University of London. His interest in writing and poetry came as a child from his elder brother, Che Chukwumerije, an avid poet and musician, and from a childhood friend, Onesi Dominic, who both shared their poetry with him.  He was also heavily influenced by his father, Uche Chukwumerije, who published a pan-Africanist magazine, Afriscope, from the 1970s into the early 1980s, and by his mother, Nwoyibo Iweka, a gifted and natural storyteller, who helped him see magic in everyday things.

Career

Poetry

Chukwumerije is a member of the Abuja Literary Society (ALS) and the host of the group's Book Jam and Poetry Slam. He has won several poetry grand slams in Nigeria including the maiden edition of the African Poet (Nigeria) Grand Slam competition. Since 2013, he has hosted and directed the annual Night of the Spoken Word (NSW) performance poetry event. as part of a movement to insert performance poetry into Nigeria's mainstream pop culture He also hosts weekly Open Mic performances which include a mix of acts from readings of short stories by their authors to musical performances, poetry, and spoken word acts.

He is Nigeria's most prolific performance poet with three successful performance poetry videos, a live poetry show (NSW – Night of the Spoken Word) now in its 5th year, and three theatre productions: The "Made in Nigeria" Poetry Show that had been successfully staged nine times – in Abuja, Lagos, Enugu, Benin, Bonny, Maiduguri, Yola, Jos, and Ile-Ife – between September 2016 and October 2018., "Let's be honest" and "Man-made gods" which had its stage debut on October 1, 2018.

His shows are now among the most anticipated events in Abuja, creatively fusing entertainment and a call for the re-awakening of national consciousness.

At TEDx Maitama in September 2017 and at the 23rd Nigeria Economic Summit in October 2017, Dike's rendition of his poem, "The Wall and The Bridge" attracted widespread public attention to his message of the need for national rebirth and a re-awakening of social consciousness.

At The Platform on May 1, 2018, Nigeria's Vice President Prof. Yemi Osinbajo recites Dike's poem "The revolution has no tribe" during his remarks on how young Nigerians are shaping the future. 
"Dike Chukwumerije reminds us in his powerful poem the Revolution has no tribe and that our destinies as Nigerians no matter our tribe or religion are inextricably tied together. What affects one affects all. Suffering neither knows tribe nor tongue."

On November 15, 2018, he was a speaker, alongside Nobel Laureate, Wole Soyinka, at the 5th Lafarge Africa National Literacy Competition in Lagos to challenge leaders to do more about Nigeria's huge literacy gap projected at 59.6% according to the CIA World Factbook.

Speaker
He also speaks at workshops for amateur writers.

References

Year of birth missing (living people)
Living people
Nigerian male poets
Nigerian male novelists
21st-century Nigerian poets
21st-century Nigerian novelists
King's College, Lagos alumni